José Angela “Joe” Aguilar (1898–1965), also called Sah Pah, was a Pueblo-American painter and potter from the San Ildefonso Pueblo tribe. In addition to painting two-dimensional artworks, he also frequently painted the pots made by his wife Rosalie Simbola and his mother Susana Aguilar. His artwork is in the permanent collection of institutions including the Hearst Museum of Anthropology and the Museum of the American Indian.

Aguilar married Rosie Simbola (from the Picurís tribe) in 1922. A number of their children went on to be notable artists as well, including sons José Vicente Aguilar and Alfred Aguilar.

References 

20th-century American painters
20th-century indigenous painters of the Americas
Native American painters
Pueblo artists
Painters from New Mexico
1898 births
1965 deaths